Mezdreya is a village in northwestern Bulgaria, located in the Berkovitsa Municipality of the Montana Province.

References

See also
List of villages in Montana Province

Villages in Montana Province